Karl Fabel (October 20, 1905 in Hamburg – March 3, 1975 in Egenhofen) was a German chess composer.

Fabel received a doctorate in chemistry and worked as a mathematician and civil judge at the federal office of brands and patents in Munich, of which he was also president.

He composed around 1250 problems of all varieties. He studied chess problems of a mathematical nature such as the Eight queens puzzle, the Knight's tour and Shannon's number. He was a director of Die Schwalbe.

External links
 Fabel problems on PDB Server
 Rund um das Schachbrett by Karl Fabel - 1955
  The "Ultimate FABEL" (project)

1905 births
1975 deaths
Chess composers
20th-century chess players